B Martin is an American rapper. Known for his collaboration with Kendrick Lamar and Juicy J, he has won won several major hip hop competitions: Best Hip Hop Artist in NY and Who's Next with Hot 97. In addition, he placed first and won T-Pain's "Motivated" competition.

He also toured with Mac Miller, opened a bunch for J Cole, Big Sean, Steve Aoki and many more. He is currently being featured as a vocalist and writer for some of the popular DJs across the world, while releasing rap records regularly.

His music career spans over 10 years, including filming over 100 music videos, writing over 1000 songs, writing Billboard Top 20 Dance Hits with over 10 million streams as a writer and 15 million as an artist.

Biography 
Brendan Martin graduated from the University at Albany’s Business school with a 4.0 GPA. He writes from his own experiences and what he went through growing up as a child. Martin is a rapper/songwriter who began establishing himself as a promising hip-hop artist in his hometown of Colonie, New York. He has performed alongside Mac Miller, Lupe Fiasco, Big Sean, Young Jeezy, Snoop Dogg and many more.

Brendan has gained a substantial following after winning SUNY Albany's "Battle of the Bands," T. Pain's "Motivated" competition, and Hot 97's "Who’s Next" competition opening for J. Cole while sweeping the "Battle for the Best" competition at Sxsw. Martin performed at Summer Jam sharing the stage with ASAP Rocky, Big K.R.I.T, Azealia Banks, Pusha T, Schoolboy Q and Kendrick Lamar.

In late 2011, B. Martin signed with Phase One Network, an imprint distributed through Sony/RED. Soon after, she released her mix CD "Ladies & Gentlemen" & "B. Martin: Pre-Mix Tape” to rave reviews. Martin didn't stop there, releasing his single "Swoosh" from "Music, Love, Enemies" as well as booking national tour dates in support of the release.

For the last 7 months of 2013, Brendan has been living in Los Angeles, working with Warner Music, and has recently created a track featuring Kendrick Lamar and Juicy J.

In 2021, he launched Purpose Driven Artists, is an independent agency. Under the Warner Music label, B Martin released the song "Need Some Space" together with Norda and Senes in 2022. B Martin co-wrote two other singles that were released that same day: "Sleeping With The Enemy", which he co-wrote with Grammy Award winner Lil Eddie, the song is produced by Canadian artists Setou & Senyo, in turn he also co-produced/wrote " Keep You Saif" (also released that same day), along with Krunk's producer, responsible for Sean Paul's "Temperature".

Discography

Studio albums 

 2013: "Music, Love, Enemies" Mixtape

Singles 

 2012: "Swoosh"
 2013: "I Want It All" (ft. Kendrick Lamar & Juicy J)
 2013: "Let it go" 
 2016: "Life Without Lauren"
 2016: "Money Can't Buy"
 2017: "No Mercy"
 2021: "Sober Love" (featuring Pryces and Tolan)
 2021: "Waiting" (featuring Palmer and Ronin)
 2021: "Control" (featuring Pryces and Tolan)
 2021: "Fire in My Veins" 
 2022: "Slaughter House" (featuring Bingx)
 2022: "Hollow" (featuring Bingx)
 2022: "Calling Me"

References 

1988 births
Living people